I'm Photogenic is a 1980 Italian comedy film directed by Dino Risi. It was screened out of competition at the 1980 Cannes Film Festival.

Plot
Italy, early 1980s. Antonio Barozzi (Renato Pozzetto), an aspiring actor, goes to the film studios in Rome, where he seeks both fame and fortune.

Cast
 Renato Pozzetto as Antonio Barozzi
 Edwige Fenech as Cinzia Pancaldi
 Aldo Maccione as Pedretti - Lawyer
 Julien Guiomar as Carlo Simoni
 Michel Galabru as Del Giudice - Producer
 Gino Santercole as Sergio
 Massimo Boldi as Sandro Rubizzi
 Attilio Dottesio as Attilio Turchese

References

External links

1980 films
1980 comedy films
1980s Italian-language films
Films directed by Dino Risi
Films scored by Manuel De Sica
Commedia all'italiana
Films set in Rome
Films set in the United States
Self-reflexive films
Films about actors
1980s Italian films